Nükleer Başlıklı Kız (NBK) is a Turkish band from Ankara. The name means "Nuclear Headed Girl" in Turkish, and is a clear allegory to Kırmızı Başlıklı Kız or Little Red Cap.

Band history 
Nükleer Başlıklı Kız was formed in Ankara in 2005. Since its formation, it has had one core member, vocalist Billur Yapıcı, who was joined by Tansel Turna in 2009. They reached the finals of the Nokia Supersound Contest in 2006 and won the Sony Ericsson Unistar Music Contest in 2007. They play regularly on stage with bass guitarist Cem Malak, keyboardist Tolga Büyük and drummer Kuzey Yılmaz.

References

External links 
Official site of Nükleer Başlıklı Kız

Rock music duos
Musical groups from Ankara
Turkish alternative rock groups
Turkish indie rock groups
Indie pop groups
Musical groups established in 2005